The United States Grand Prix is a motor racing event that has been held on and off since 1908, when it was known as the American Grand Prize. The Grand Prix later became part of the Formula One World Championship. , the Grand Prix has been held 51 times at ten different locations. Since 2012, it has been held every year at the Circuit of the Americas in Austin, Texas, except in 2020 when it was cancelled due to the COVID-19 pandemic in the United States.

History

Beginnings and the Vanderbilt Cup
Inspired by the Gordon Bennett Cup and Circuit des Ardennes races he had competed in, William Kissam Vanderbilt founded a series of road races in the United States to showcase American road racing to the world. The Vanderbilt Cup soon became an institution on New York's Long Island, attracting American and European competitors alike. However, the race was plagued by crowd control problems, which led to spectator deaths and injuries, and the cancellation of the 1907 event. Upon its return for 1908, the American Automobile Association did not adopt the new Grand Prix regulations agreed upon by the Association Internationale des Automobiles Clubs Reconnus (AIACR). This led the rival Automobile Club of America, an enthusiasts group with strong ties to Europe, to sponsor the American Grand Prize, using the Grand Prix rules. The Savannah Automobile Club of Savannah, Georgia, which had staged two days of successful stock car races on March 18 and 19, 1908, won the rights to stage the event.

The Grand Prize era
The Savannah Automobile Club laid out a lengthened version of their stock car course, totaling . Georgia Governor M. Hoke Smith authorized the use of convict labor to construct the circuit of oiled gravel. The Governor also sent state militia troops to augment local police patrols in keeping the crowd in check, hoping to avoid the pitfalls of the Vanderbilt Cup races. The entry for the inaugural race featured 14 European and six American entries, including factory teams from Benz, Fiat, and Renault. In the race, held on Thanksgiving Day, Ralph DePalma led early in his Fiat, before falling back with lubrication and tire problems. The race came down to a three-way battle between the Benz of Victor Hémery and the Fiats of Louis Wagner and Felice Nazzaro. Wagner won the race by the close margin of 56 seconds.

Despite the success of the Savannah event, it was decided that the 1909 race would be held on Long Island, in conjunction with the Vanderbilt Cup. However, only the Vanderbilt race was held and the Grand Prize pushed back to the next year. After the 1910 Vanderbilt Cup saw more issues, including the deaths of two riding mechanics and several serious spectator injuries, the Grand Prize was cancelled once again. A last-minute request by the Savannah club saved the race for the year, but only gave one month to prepare the course. A shorter  course was laid out, but due to the short notice, most European teams were not able to make the trip. The leading trio from 1908 did make it and American David Bruce-Brown joined the Benz squad. Bruce-Brown won another incredibly tight race over teammate Hémery, this time by only 1.42 seconds. The 1911 event returned to Savannah, and this time the Vanderbilt Cup came with it; the Cup and Grand Prize were to be held together until 1916. Despite the success of the events, public pressure started to mount on the organizers. The use of convict labor and the militia drew criticism, as did the nuisance of closing roads for the event. Two accidents on the open roads in practice, one resulting in the death of Jay McNay, cast a shadow over the event. The American entries dominated the support events and ran well throughout the Grand Prize, after poor showings in past years and once again Bruce-Brown triumphed, this time driving a Fiat.

For 1912, Savannah succumbed to public pressure, and Milwaukee, Wisconsin, won the bid for the race. A narrow,  trapezoidal course was set up on the outskirts of the city, in Wauwatosa. As in 1911, tragedy struck in practice when David Bruce-Brown was killed after a puncture sent him off the road. On the final lap of the race, Ralph DePalma collided with eventual winner Caleb Bragg, seriously injuring DePalma and his mechanic and ending any chance of a second race at Milwaukee.

The Grand Prize was not held in 1913, after Long Island's bid was rejected and Savannah refused to provide sufficient prize money. Oval racing on board tracks had taken off in the United States, to the detriment of road racing. For 1914, the Grand Prize and Vanderbilt Cup were staged in Santa Monica, California near Los Angeles, on an  course, with the start/finish straight along the Pacific Ocean. The field was primarily American entries (twelve, against five European entries), and the Americans dominated, with Eddie Pullen's Mercer winning by over 40 seconds. In 1915, the race shifted to San Francisco, in conjunction with the Panama–Pacific International Exposition. With the outbreak of World War I in Europe, almost all of the drivers and cars were American, except for a few cars imported earlier. The  course was set up around the Exposition grounds and nearby oval track with a boarded main straightaway. Heavy rain began two hours into the race, covering the circuit in mud from the extensive flower arrangements, and warping the main straight's boards. Dario Resta in a Peugeot cruised to a seven-minute victory, and followed up a week later by winning the Vanderbilt Cup. For 1916, the Grand Prize returned to Santa Monica. The race would be a part of the AAA National Championship, which carried a 4.91-liter displacement limit. Although the limit for the Grand Prize was 7.37 liters, no large-displacement cars would enter. The race was the penultimate round of the championship, with Dario Resta leading Johnny Aitken after his Vanderbilt Cup win. However, both cars would be out before halfway. Although Aitken took over teammate Howdy Wilcox's car for the win, the AAA awarded points only to Wilcox, and Resta took the championship.

Post-war decline and the Indianapolis 500
The Grand Prize was discontinued after the 1916 event. Between a lack of European participation due to World War I and the growing American interest in oval racing, road racing fell by the wayside. The two Santa Monica events were the only road races on the 1916 championship, and the aborted 1917 National Championship was slated to feature eight events, all ovals and six of them board tracks. The Vanderbilt Cup was revived in 1936 and 1937 and run to Grand Prix regulations; these races were run at the Roosevelt Park Autodrome near New York City but a lack of competition and domination by German Bernd Rosemeyer and Italian Tazio Nuvolari led to the races being a commercial failure.

The Indianapolis 500 kept a connection to European racing, running to Grand Prix regulations between 1923 and 1930, and from 1938 until 1953. In the late 1920s, efforts were made to refer to the 500 as the American Grand Prize. The Grand Prize trophy was awarded to the winner of the Indianapolis 500 between 1930 and 1936, when it was replaced by the Borg-Warner Trophy. The race was included in the World Championship from 1950 through 1960.

Sebring (1959) and Riverside (1958, 1960)
One of its first events was an SCCA National sports car race. For 1958, the race moved to the new, professional USAC Road Racing Championship, and was billed as the "United States Grand Prix". The race attracted over 50 cars and drivers from sports car series in the US and Europe, as well as USAC and NASCAR. Chuck Daigh won in a Scarab, beating Dan Gurney's Ferrari in second place.

Russian-born Alec Ulmann staged the first 12 Hours of Sebring endurance race in 1952 at the airport (converted from World War II use) of the rather isolated central Florida town of Sebring, located 1-1/2 hours south of Orlando and Tampa, and 3 hours north of Miami. The track was formed using service roads and runways of Sebring's airport, and it became a round of the World Sportscar Championship in 1953. Buoyed by the success of the 12 Hours, the Riverside sports car race and Formula Libre events at Watkins Glen and Lime Rock Park, Ulmann decided to stage a Formula One race at Sebring International Raceway in 1959. The race was billed as the "II United States Grand Prix", cementing the Riverside race as a part of the Grand Prix's heritage. The race was originally scheduled for March 22, the day after the 12 Hour-race, but rescheduled for December 12, the final round of the season. The race took place 3 months after the previous round at Monza. The starting grid included seven American drivers, but New Zealand's Bruce McLaren, in a Cooper, took his first win in F1 and was, at the time, the youngest driver ever to win a Grand Prix. McLaren took the lead on the last lap of the race when his team-mate, Jack Brabham, ran out of fuel. Brabham had to push his car over the line to finish fourth. By virtue of Ferrari's Tony Brooks finishing third, Brabham and Cooper took the Drivers' and Constructors' championships, respectively. Despite providing an exciting climax to the season, the race was not successful from the hosts' standpoint, the race's isolated location did not help the event's success as the promoters barely broke even. When prize money checks bounced, Charles Moran and Briggs Cunningham paid the money to save face for their country.

Ulmann moved the race across the country to Riverside for 1960. Stirling Moss put on quite a show in his privately entered Lotus by winning from pole position. However, while the driver's purse was enormous (as at Sebring), the event was no better received than the previous year's due to a lack of promotion, and proximity to the successful Times Grand Prix. Again Moran and Cunningham would pay the prize money.

Watkins Glen (1961–1980)

1960s 
Through most of 1961, Ulmann was listed as the promoter of the USGP; he contacted organizers in Miami and Bill France of the Daytona International Speedway but was unable to reach agreements. In August, racing promoter Cameron Argetsinger, executive director of the  Watkins Glen Grand Prix Race Course in the central Finger Lakes region of upstate New York, offered his circuit to the Automobile Competition Committee for the United States (ACCUS) to host the Grand Prix. The Watkins Glen circuit, which had hosted Formula Libre events, had similarities to the British Brands Hatch circuit: both had several banked corners and were sited in very green parts of the world. ACCUS accepted on August 28. Watkins Glen would host the United States Grand Prix for the next 20 years, longer than any other location before or since. It would receive the Grand Prix Drivers' Association award for the best-organized and best-staged Grand Prix of the season in 1965, 1970, and 1971. The track would become known as the "Mecca" of American road racing and weave itself into European Grand Prix racing culture.

With just six weeks to organize the October 8 event, Argetsinger assembled the field, but was unable to convince Scuderia Ferrari to make the trip, leaving Richie Ginther and recently crowned World Champion Phil Hill out of their home Grand Prix. Innes Ireland took a surprise win, his first and the first for Team Lotus. Dan Gurney's Porsche was second, and Tony Brooks, racing in his last Grand Prix, took third. Stirling Moss, in his own final Grand Prix, retired with engine problems. Unlike the previous two races, the race was well attended (over 60,000) and turned a profit. The race purse was paid in cash, a popular move with the teams after the previous two years' payment issues. 

1962 saw Briton Jim Clark win in a Lotus; the next three races were won by fellow-Briton Graham Hill, each time in a BRM. Hill's 1964 win enabled him to carry a points advantage into the next and final race in Mexico. 1966 and 1967 saw Clark win; the '66 win was the only Formula One race he won that year, driving a Lotus with an overweight BRM H16 engine. Both the Drivers' and Constructors' championships were clinched at the event by Australian Jack Brabham and his Brabham team. In 1967, Clark dominated, leading comfortably from his teammate Hill and Denny Hulme in a Brabham. In 1968, Mario Andretti put his Lotus 49 on pole position in his first Formula One race. But Andretti retired, and Briton Jackie Stewart won the race in a Ford/Cosworth-powered Matra. Austrian Jochen Rindt won in 1969 – his first Formula One race win. He took advantage of Stewart's mechanical problems to pull a huge gap out on the rest of the field. Graham Hill had a much worse day. He punctured his car's rear right tire and the rubber came off the rim. The rubber exploded, sending the Lotus cartwheeling off the course, and Hill was thrown out of the car, breaking both legs. 

Due to USGP's position on the calendar near the end of the season, often either the final or penultimate round, championships were often decided before the event. In part to offset this, race organizers offered large sums of prize money; in 1969 the purse totaled $200,000 (with $50,000 for the winner), and when in 1972 it was raised to $275,000, the Tyrrell team earned a record $100,000.

1970s 
1970 saw Brazilian newcomer Emerson Fittipaldi win the race in just his fourth Formula One start. Stewart retired his new Tyrrell and Fittipaldi, driving a Lotus, held off a charge from Mexican Pedro Rodriguez in a BRM. It was an emotional win for Colin Chapman's Lotus team, as team leader Rindt had been killed while practicing for the Italian Grand Prix at Monza. Lotus had not run the Canadian Grand Prix, but because the next closest championship contender Jacky Ickx did not score enough points to keep him in contention, the Drivers' Championship was won by Rindt posthumously at this race. Team Lotus also won the Constructors' Championship at the 1970 event.

In 1971, the course was changed considerably. It also saw a new pitlane and pit straight and three new corners (a new first, second-to last and last corners). The improvements cost nearly $2.5 million ($13 million in 2010 dollars). The alterations considerably heightened the driving challenge of the track, and it became even more popular than it had been with drivers, teams and fans. Watkins Glen had been transformed from a quick, small circuit into a fast and very tough up-and-down circuit where just about every corner was banked and long; uncommonly hard driving and maximum effort was required for almost every part of a lap. 1971 was the first running on the completed full circuit (the circuit was not completed in time for previous races, so the completed short circuit was used) and it saw popular Frenchman François Cevert win his only Grand Prix for Tyrrell, and the biggest cash prize in Formula One: $267,000. 1972 saw Jackie Stewart win after Emerson Fittipaldi had already won the championship at the previous race, the Italian Grand Prix at Monza. Cevert made it a Tyrrell 1–2. At this point, the race was attracting many entries; 30 drivers entered and qualified for the 1972 race.

Jackie Stewart, unknown to almost everyone (including his wife Helen), had planned to retire after the 1973 race. He had already won his third Drivers' Championship two races previously at Monza and he would be running his 100th and final Grand Prix. But during qualifying, Stewart's teammate and friend Cevert was killed. Going into the nearly flat out uphill Esses, Cevert lost control and struck the barrier on the left side nearly head on at 150 mph. The car vaulted over the barriers and Cevert was killed instantly. The marshals left Cevert in the car and threw a cover over the cockpit. A distraught Stewart and his team's manager Ken Tyrrell withdrew the team, handing the Constructors' Championship to Lotus. Stewart retired with immediate effect. In the race, Swede Ronnie Peterson in a Lotus beat Briton driver James Hunt in a Hesketh-entered March to the finish by 0.6 of a second. American Peter Revson finished fifth at his home race.

The 1974 event was to decide the world championship between Fittipaldi and Swiss Clay Regazzoni, who had the same number of points. Regazzoni, driving a Ferrari, ran into a host of problems during the race and finished out of the points. Fittipaldi finished fifth, which won him his second Drivers' Championship. The event was marred by yet another fatal accident. Austrian Helmut Koinigg crashed at the fast, long Outer Loop corner, the bend after the extended back straight on Lap 10. Koinigg's Surtees went straight on and the car went under the barriers, killing him instantly. The race was a Brabham 1–2, with Argentine Carlos Reutemann winning with Brazilian Carlos Pace second. 1975 saw a medium-speed chicane added to the Esses to slow the cars down. The race was a politically charged event. Regazzoni held up Fittipaldi's second-placed McLaren for six laps to try to help his teammate and leader of the race Niki Lauda get ahead; Fittipaldi eventually lapped the Swiss. However, Regazzoni was black-flagged by Clerk of the Course Berdie Martin, angering Ferrari team manager Luca di Montezemolo, who withdrew Regazzoni in protest. Their other driver, recently crowned Drivers' Champion Lauda, went on to win from Fittipaldi.

1976 saw James Hunt win in a McLaren while his closest championship contender Lauda finished third, putting Hunt just three points behind Lauda for the season's final race at Fuji, Japan. The race also saw Jacky Ickx crash at the Chute; the Belgian survived but was injured. 1977 saw rain throughout the race. Hunt won again on a wet track as he held off home favorite Mario Andretti in a Lotus 78 to win by two seconds. The 1978 race took place two weeks after the death of Ronnie Peterson at Monza. Andretti had already accumulated enough points to win the Drivers' Championship before coming to Watkins Glen. Mechanical problems forced Andretti to retire early from the race, which was won by Carlos Reutemann in a Ferrari 312T3. 1979 saw Ferrari driver Gilles Villeneuve win a wet race after Australian Alan Jones retired after dominating much of the race.

By this time, Watkins Glen had begun to deteriorate. Drivers began complaining about the bumpy track surface, and the teams and press were concerned over facilities, the lackluster level of security and rowdy fans. Race attendees began to go to the so-called "Bog", located inside the Boot, to set fire to objects and do other destructive things; cars and even a Greyhound bus in 1974 were burned there. Even though the Bog was made into a parking lot in 1975, things still did not improve sufficiently over the years. In 1978, the European motorsports governing body, FISA, demanded that the track owners make safety improvements to the track, which were made; and then the event was due to be cancelled for the 1980 season, but it was given a reprieve by FISA after promising to upgrade facilities over the winter. After initially being given an April 13 date on the calendar, the race was moved to October 5. Organizers were finally able to secure funding for circuit improvements in late August, and the track was resurfaced. But they still needed a $750,000 loan from the Formula One Constructors' Association (FOCA) to pay prize money and other expenses. Alan Jones won the 1980 race for Williams after he went off at the first corner on the first lap and charged through the field into second place from 17th, and he ended up taking the checkered flag after pole sitter Bruno Giacomelli retired with electrical problems near the Chute. Reutemann would make it a Williams 1–2, followed by Frenchman Didier Pironi in a Ligier. But this would prove to be the final United States Grand Prix at the Glen. It was initially included on the 1981 calendar, but cancelled after the debts could not be paid and government loans were denied.

Phoenix (1989–1991)

In addition to the United States Grand Prix at Watkins Glen, another race called the United States Grand Prix West in Long Beach, California, just outside Los Angeles, was first held in 1976. After Watkins Glen's demise, other Formula One Grands Prix in the United States were briefly held on street circuits in Detroit and Dallas, and a car park in Las Vegas. The Detroit Grand Prix was the longest lasting, from 1982 to 1988; plans to continue Formula One races in Detroit at Belle Isle Park did not materialize, and in 1989, Formula One moved to the Sonoran Desert city of Phoenix, Arizona, bringing the United States Grand Prix name back for the first time since 1980. The Phoenix street circuit in the center of the city was unpopular with drivers and the event was largely ignored by the local populace. Phoenix, like many American cities, was designed on the grid system; the circuit was made up entirely of 2nd gear 90-degree corners and provided nearly no driving challenge or exciting corners to watch cars go around. The circuit was less bumpy and wider than Detroit, and its long straights made it easy to overtake and difficult to judge braking.

The inaugural event in 1989 was held at short notice and it could only be held in June (Detroit's former date), one of the hottest months in Phoenix, a city with summer temperatures regularly going past . Temperatures neared  on race weekend. Out of 40,000 capacity, 34,441 tickets were sold. Ecclestone expected the event to be sold out but was told that the local populace avoided outdoor events during summer. The race was moved to March, as the opening round of the season, for the next two years. The McLaren team dominated all three years, with Alain Prost winning in 1989 and Ayrton Senna in 1990 and 1991. The 1989 race saw Prost win his only Grand Prix in the United States by taking advantage of Senna's engine electronics problems.  The 1990 race saw emerging French star Jean Alesi harrying Senna for a number of laps; the Tyrrell driver went on to finish second behind Senna. The circuit had to be changed for the 1991 race due to the construction of a new Phoenix Suns basketball arena, and the revised circuit was generally seen to be an improvement. Senna won the race from pole position. On October 7, 1991, members of International Auto Sport Federation (FISA) met to discuss the agenda for the 1992 Formula One season, where they voted to cancel the contract with city of Phoenix. That same year, Phoenix assistant city manager David Garcia said the city had already invested $1.3 million dollars preparing for the 1992 race and was in negotiations with Ecclestone on contract cancellation. Ecclestone was asked if poor attendance was to blame for the Phoenix race pull out; he said that attendance was never a problem but the inability to place more than 20,000 seats in a way where fans could have a better view was. There were rumors of a race on the streets of the Manhattan borough of New York City for 1992 and a race on the streets of the Las Vegas Strip for 1995, but these never materialized and a Formula 1 event would not be held in United States for the next 9 years.

Indianapolis (2000–2007) 

It was not until 2000 that another United States Grand Prix took place, this time at the Indianapolis Motor Speedway in Indiana. Indianapolis was rumored to have been considering a Formula One race since the USGP left Phoenix; with a proposed street race for the 1990 season in downtown Indianapolis. The  infield road course uses about a mile of the oval, but in a clockwise direction. The crowd at the 2000 race was estimated at over 225,000, one of the largest ever in F1. Michael Schumacher's win was his second of four straight to end the season as he overtook Mika Häkkinen for his third Championship. In 2001, the race took place less than three weeks after the September 11, 2001 attacks in the US, and many teams and drivers featured special tributes to the USA on their cars and helmets and saw McLaren driver Häkkinen take his last Grand Prix win. The 2002 edition saw Schumacher and teammate Rubens Barrichello trading places near the finish line as Schumacher attempted to engineer a dead heat with Barrichello. 2003 saw a race held in  mixed conditions race won by Michael Schumacher.  Held in September in its first four years (in order to distance it from the "500" and NASCAR's Brickyard 400), the USGP at Indianapolis was moved to an early summer date in 2004 in late June, 3 weeks after the Indy 500 so it could be paired with the Canadian Grand Prix and to make room for new Asian rounds. In 2005, problems with Michelin tires led to seven teams withdrawing from the race after the formation lap. Only the three teams (six cars) with Bridgestone tires started the race, and the event was considered a farce with Ferrari's Michael Schumacher claiming a third consecutive win in the United States Grand Prix ahead of teammate Barrichello with Portuguese driver  Tiago Monteiro claiming his only Formula One podium finish by finishing a lap down on winner Schumacher in third place for the Jordan team. Many commentators questioned whether a United States Grand Prix would be held in Indianapolis again, but the 2006 United States Grand Prix was held the next year, on July 2, 2006, without controversy with Schumacher winning the event for a fourth consecutive time and fifth time overall, ahead of his then-new Ferrari teammate Felipe Massa. Lewis Hamilton won the final US Grand Prix at Indianapolis in 2007.
 

On July 12, 2007, Formula One and the Indianapolis Motor Speedway announced that the 2007 US Grand Prix would be the last one held at IMS for the foreseeable future, as both sides could not agree on the terms for the event. Then-Indianapolis Motor Speedway CEO, Tony George, claimed that the USGP would not return to Indianapolis unless it made financial sense. Due to the expensive fees paid to host a Grand Prix, the race would require a title sponsor to be economically viable. Ultimately, the United States Grand Prix was not on the Formula One calendar for 2009.

Austin (2012–2019, 2021–)
In August 2009, Formula One president Bernie Ecclestone remarked that there was no immediate plan to return Formula One to the United States, vowing "never to return" to Indianapolis. Nevertheless, shortly before the first race of the  season, Ecclestone continued to fuel speculation that a return to Indianapolis was not out of the question.

Various efforts were made to try and bring the race to the New York City region. In March 2010, Ecclestone announced plans to bring a Formula One race to New York City for the  season. Ecclestone was quoted as saying the race would take place across the Hudson River in New Jersey, with the Manhattan skyline overlooking the circuit. In May 2010, plans emerged for a circuit to be built in Jersey City's Liberty State Park, but those plans were abandoned shortly thereafter. A race in West New York and Weehawken was later announced in October 2011. In May 2010, it was announced that Monticello Motor Club in upstate New York – a circuit complex modeled on a private country club near Monticello – had submitted a bid for the rights to host the race.

The event is being held on a purpose-built new track, which was named Circuit of the Americas (COTA). In July 2010, promoter Tavo Hellmund promised that the circuit would be one of the "most challenging and spectacular in the world" and that it would include a selection of corner sequences inspired by "the very best circuits" in the world.

On November 15, 2011, it was reported that construction of the circuit had been temporarily halted as the owners had not yet been awarded the contract to stage the race in 2012, following reports that Bernie Ecclestone had cast doubt on the race taking place. After Tavo Hellmund's contract was found in breach by Ecclestone and a new contract was entered into between Formula 1 and the original track investors, Red McCombs and Bobby Epstein, the US Grand Prix was confirmed to be held at the Circuit of the Americas in Austin on the original scheduled date in 2012. Reigning champion Sebastian Vettel took pole for the first race at the Texas circuit but it was 2007 winner Lewis Hamilton who kept his unbeaten run in the US as the two finished almost 40 seconds ahead of third.

On November 11, 2015, the Texas government cut nearly $6 million of the required $25 million in funding to host the event. Attendance numbers had dropped to 224,011 in October 2015, for the 2015 United States Grand Prix event, after heavy rain from a quickly dissipating Hurricane Patricia. On March 9, 2016, it was confirmed the race would continue to run in Austin, despite the funding cuts. 2016 turned out to be the best-attended Grand Prix in Austin: boosted by a heated World Drivers' Championship battle between Lewis Hamilton and Nico Rosberg, good weather, and the allure of a Saturday night concert from pop singer Taylor Swift, nearly 270,000 people went through the turnstiles during the race weekend. On October 22, 2017, Lewis Hamilton won the race. Former US president Bill Clinton awarded the winning trophy. Justin Timberlake's concert helped boost the Grand Prix attendance by 40,000 over the previous year. In 2018, Britney Spears and Bruno Mars performed.

The originally planned 2020 race at COTA was cancelled due to the effects of the COVID-19 pandemic in the United States. The race returned in 2021. COTA is due to host Formula One until 2026.

Other Grands Prix in the United States

The United States Grand Prix is the longest-running Formula One World Championship event held in the United States. Previously, however, there were four other separate F1 events in the US

From  until , the Long Beach circuit hosted a newly created United States Grand Prix West, which ran in the same seasons as the United States Grand Prix (East). During the years – when both Grands Prix ran, the United States Grand Prix was also referred to as the United States Grand Prix East. The  Formula One season thus featured three Grands Prix in the United States – the first time in World Championship history that a country hosted more than two Grands Prix.

A potential new Grand Prix in the New York City area was announced for the 1983 season, to be held either at the Meadowlands Sports Complex, Meadow Lake in Flushing Meadows, or Mitchel Field in Hempstead, Long Island (on the same site as the 1936 and 1937 Vanderbilt Cups). However, the race was first postponed and then cancelled, as CART started their own race at the Meadowlands, and titled it the "United States Grand Prix".
The most serious effort to date to bring a Grand Prix to New York City was the Grand Prix of America at the Port Imperial Street Circuit, which was included on the proposed 2013 calendar but was then cancelled. In 2022, the first Miami Grand Prix was held at the Miami International Autodrome, a track specifically designed for F1, located around the Hard Rock Stadium in the Miami suburb of Miami Gardens, Florida. The Las Vegas Grand Prix is due to take place from 2023.

Winners
From 1908 to 1916, the race was named the American Grand Prize. Six American drivers have won the United States Grand Prix, all except one when it was known as the American Grand Prize, which was not part of the Grand Prix calendar. Chuck Daigh also won it as a non-championship race at Riverside in 1958. But while the event has been part of the Formula One World Championship, no American has won the event; however Mario Andretti won the 1977 United States Grand Prix West in Long Beach, California.

Repeat winners (drivers)
Drivers in bold are competing in the Formula One championship in the current season. A pink background indicates an event which was not part of the Formula One World Championship.

Repeat winners (constructors)
Teams in bold are competing in the Formula One championship in the current season.
A pink background indicates an event which was not part of the Formula One World Championship.

Repeat winners (engine manufacturers)
Manufacturers in bold are competing in the Formula One championship in the current season.
A pink background indicates an event which was not part of the Formula One World Championship.

* Built by Cosworth, funded by Ford

** Built by Ilmor in 2001, funded by Mercedes

By year
A pink background indicates an event which was not part of the Formula One World Championship.

Previous circuits used

References

Sources

 "2012 US Grand Prix winners Trophies revealed – A sign of precision, pace and Texas", formula1onlive.com, Retrieved on November 1, 2012.

External links

 Circuit of The Americas
 Formula 1 United States Grand Prix

 
Formula One Grands Prix
Pre-World Championship Grands Prix
National Grands Prix
Recurring sporting events established in 1908
1908 establishments in Georgia (U.S. state)
Circuit of the Americas
Annual sporting events in the United States